Zoran Slišković (born 1 March 1966) is a former Croatian football player, who played as a forward.

Club career
Born in Trpanj on the Croatian peninsula of Pelješac, Slišković trained, without proper coaching, on his own, at the local :hr:NK Faraon Trpanj, before moving on as a teenager to play for a couple of seasons to the nearby :hr:NK Grk Potomje. He claims to have been coached properly only when he came, aged 18, to Neretvanac Opuzen, quickly ascending to the first team. The following season, Slišković joined FK Željezničar Sarajevo in the Yugoslav First League, with coach Ivica Osim giving him green light after a trial.

Slišković moved to Greece in July 1992, joining first division side AEK Athens for two seasons. He won 2 championships with AEK helping the team a lot with his performances and his goals, while he was also the top scorer of the Greek Cup in 1994 with 10 goals. On 31 October 1992 he scored a brace helping his team won in the away match against Skoda Xanthi with 3–4. On 6 June 1993 he opened the score at the first minute, in the 3–1 win against Olympiacos. On 22 December 1993 he scored the decider in the 1–2 away victory over OFI. He scored the winner against Iraklis away from home, on 13 March 1994. On 3 April 1994, he also scored the winner in the away match against Edessaikos. In the summer of 1994, the people of AEK, in their effort to strengthen the team for the qualifying games of the UEFA Champions League group stage, did not offer him a contract renewal, in order to free up a foreigner position. Slišković signed with Paniliakos in the second division, where he played for one season. Afterwards he returned to Croatia to play for two season for Croatia Zagreb, before retiring in 1999 at Slaven Belupo.

Honours

AEK Athens
Alpha Ethniki: 1992–93, 1993–94

Individual
Greek Cup Top scorer: 1993–94

References

External links
Profile at 1hnl.net
Profile at Strukljeva.net

1966 births
Living people
People from Dubrovnik-Neretva County
Association football forwards
Yugoslav footballers
Croatian footballers
FK Željezničar Sarajevo players
GNK Dinamo Zagreb players
AEK Athens F.C. players
Paniliakos F.C. players
NK Slaven Belupo players
Croatian Football League players
Super League Greece players
Croatian expatriate footballers
Expatriate footballers in Greece
Croatian expatriate sportspeople in Greece